The FC Basel 1896–97 season was their fourth season since the club's foundation on 15 November 1893. Emanuel Schiess was the club's chairman, but he stood down at the club's AGM and Charlie Volderauer was elected as new chairman. He was the club's third chairman in their history, following Roland Geldner (1893–1896) and Schiess. FC Basel played their home games in the Landhof, in the Wettstein neighborhood of Kleinbasel (lesser Basel). The Swiss national championships had not yet been called to into life.

Overview 
The idea of a Swiss national championship came to review with the Swiss Football Association, that had been founded the previous year and of which Basel and local rivals Old Boys were a member. But such a championship had not yet been called to into life.

The club chairman Charlie Volderauer was the team captain this season. For this season club organised seven friendly matches for their first team. Four of these matches were held in Basel, one in the Landhof, two on the Schützenmatte and from the fourth the place of playing field is uncertain. Basel played two games in Mulhouse. The first against Strassburger FV was lost 3–4 and the second against FC Mulhouse was lost 2–3. Five games were played in November/December and the other two in March and June. Of the seven games, two were won, two were draw and the team suffered three defeats. The team scored 16 and conceded nine goals.

Players

Results

Legend

Friendly matches

Autumn

Spring

See also 
 History of FC Basel
 List of FC Basel players
 List of FC Basel seasons

References

Sources 
 Rotblau: Jahrbuch Saison 2014/2015. Publisher: FC Basel Marketing AG. 
 Die ersten 125 Jahre. Publisher: Josef Zindel im Friedrich Reinhardt Verlag, Basel. 
 FCB squad 1896–1897 at fcb-archiv.ch
''(NB: Despite all efforts, the editors of these books and the authors in "Basler Fussballarchiv" have failed to be able to identify all the players, their date and place of birth or date and place of death, who played in the games during the early years of FC Basel.)

External links 
 FC Basel official site

FC Basel seasons
Basel